The Men's 200 metre backstroke event at the 2013 Southeast Asian Games took place on 12 December 2013 at Wunna Theikdi Aquatics Centre.

There were 10 competitors from 7 countries who took part in this event. Two heats were held. The heat in which a swimmer competed did not formally matter for advancement, as the swimmers with the top eight times from both field qualified for the finals.

Schedule
All times are Myanmar Standard Time (UTC+06:30)

Records

Results

Heats

Final

References

External links
27seagames2013.com

Swimming at the 2013 Southeast Asian Games